Mainxe is a former commune in the Charente department in southwestern France. On 1 January 2019, it was merged into the new commune Mainxe-Gondeville.

Population

See also
Communes of the Charente department

References

Former communes of Charente
Populated places disestablished in 2019